The 2006 Hungaroring GP2 Series round were a pair of motor races held on 5 and 6 August 2006 at the Hungaroring in Mogyoród, Pest, Hungary as part of the GP2 Series. It was the ninth round of the 2006 GP2 Series season. The race weekend supported the 2006 Hungarian Grand Prix.

Classification

Qualifying 

 Alexandre Prémat was given a ten-place penalty after for causing accident with Hiroki Yoshimoto of race two in German.

Feature race

Sprint race

References

Hungaroring
GP2
Hungarian GP2